The Medina Metro or Madinah Metro is a planned three-line metro system for the city of Medina, Saudi Arabia.

Planning
On 4 November 2013 the Saudi cabinet announced that a metro would be built in Madinah within eight years.  A committee for the project was to be chaired by the Governor of Medina, Prince Faisal bin Salman.

In March 2015 the Madinah Metro Development Authority (MMDA) awarded French companies Systra (consortium leader) and Egis Group a 12-month contract to carry out feasibility studies and produce preliminary design for the metro. The network is to be built in two phases for opening in 2020s.

Network
 Line 
 Line 
 Line 

Total route length of 95 km. 25 km would be underground and 48 km elevated.

See also 
 Jeddah Metro
 Makkah Metro
 Riyadh Metro
 Haramain High Speed Rail Project
 List of metro systems

References 

Rapid transit in Saudi Arabia
Metro
Proposed rapid transit
Proposed rail infrastructure in Saudi Arabia
Rapid transit systems under construction